Masoud Hedayatifard, born in Babol, (Mazandaran, Northern province), Iran, is a specialist in fishery science and industries. Since 1997, he is a faculty member of the Islamic Azad University. Hedayatifard has published more than 215 scientific articles on aquatic areas in English and Persian and some of them have been re-indexed in ISI journals, ScienceAlert, ISC journals, academic journals, and SID Journals.

References
Islamic Azad University Science & Research Branch
Google Scholar Page

External links 
Official Academic site
Google page

Living people
Iranian zoologists
People from Babol
Academic staff of the Islamic Azad University
Year of birth missing (living people)